NIKON COOLPIX L110 is a compact point-and-shoot digital camera produced by Nikon. It is branded as part of the "Life" or "L-series" cameras in the Coolpix family. It has a 12.1 megapixel maximum resolution, 3.0" TFT LCD monitor, 15x Optical Zoom, D-Lighting, Vibration Reduction and Face-priority AF. It comes with 1 cm macro and 15 scene modes inbuilt functions. It also records High Definition video.

Sample Photos

References

L110